Lasse Svan Hansen (born 31 August 1983) is a Danish retired handballer, who last played for SG Flensburg-Handewitt and the Danish national team.

He won the Danish championship with GOG.

He became European Champion with the Danish national team, after winning the 2012 Championship in Serbia, defeating the host nation in the final, 21–19.

In 2011, he also won silver medal at the World Championships in Sweden.

In 2021, he became the top appearance maker for SG Flensburg-Handewitt.

Individual awards
All-star Right wing of the Olympic Games: 2016

Honours
EHF Champions League :
 : 2014
 German Championship:
 : 2018, 2019
German Cup:
: 2015
German Super Cup
: 2013, 2019
Danish Championship:
: 2004, 2007
Danish Handball Cup:
: 2002, 2003, 2005

References

External links

1983 births
Living people
Danish male handball players
SG Flensburg-Handewitt players
Handball-Bundesliga players
Expatriate handball players
Danish expatriate sportspeople in Germany
Handball players at the 2012 Summer Olympics
Handball players at the 2016 Summer Olympics
Olympic handball players of Denmark
Medalists at the 2016 Summer Olympics
Olympic gold medalists for Denmark
Olympic medalists in handball
People from Stevns Municipality
Handball players at the 2020 Summer Olympics
Medalists at the 2020 Summer Olympics
Olympic silver medalists for Denmark
Sportspeople from Region Zealand